Tony Narvaes is an American politician. He served as a Republican member of the Hawaii House of Representatives.

Life and career
Narvaes attended Damien High School, Spokane Community College and the University of Hawaiʻi.

In 1977, Narvaes was elected to the Hawaii House of Representatives, serving until 1983. In the same year, he was a councilman for the Honolulu City Council, serving until 1987.

References 

Living people
Year of birth missing (living people)
Place of birth missing (living people)
Republican Party members of the Hawaii House of Representatives
20th-century American politicians
Spokane Community College alumni
University of Hawaiʻi at Mānoa alumni
Honolulu City Council members